Pedro Almodóvar is a Spanish filmmaker, director, screenwriter, producer, and former actor, acclaimed as one of the most internationally successful Spanish filmmakers, with his filmography gaining worldwide interest and developing a cult following. Known for his distinctive style of black-comedies and melodramas that explore themes like family, passion and desire, he has received several awards and nominations both in Spain and worldwide throughout his career.
He achieved international recognition for his black comedy-drama film Women on the Verge of a Nervous Breakdown (1988), which was nominated for the Academy Award for Best Foreign Language Film as well as the Golden Globe Award for Best Foreign Language Film. His next movies Tie Me Up! Tie Me Down! and The Flower of My Secret would continue his success at his home country, with both being nominated for the Goya Award for Best Director. In 1999 he release All About My Mother followed by Talk to Her in 2002, both received critical acclaim and won Academy Awards, the former won the Academy Award for Best Foreign Language Film, the BAFTA Award for Best Film not in the English Language and the Golden Globe Award for Best Foreign Language Film while the latter won the Academy Award for Best Original Screenplay and he was nominated for Best Director. Through the 2000s and the 2010s he released several films, Volver in 2006, Broken Embraces in 2009, The Skin I Live In in 2011, Julieta in 2016 and Pain and Glory in 2019, the latter being his third nomination for the Academy Award for Best Intertational Feature Film. In 2019 he won the Golden Lion Lifetime Achievement Award at Venice Film Festival.

Academy Awards
The Academy Awards are a set of awards given by the Academy of Motion Picture Arts and Sciences annually for excellence of cinematic achievements.

British Academy Film Awards
The British Academy Film Award is an annual award show presented by the British Academy of Film and Television Arts.

Berlin International Film Festival
The Berlin International Film Festival, is an annual film festival held in Berlin, Germany.

Cannes Film Festival
The Cannes Film Festival, is an annual film festival held in Cannes, France.

César Awards
The César Awards are the national film awards of France presented by Académie des Arts et Techniques du Cinéma.

Critics' Choice Movie Awards
The Critics' Choice Movie Awards are presented annually since 1995 by the Broadcast Film Critics Association for outstanding achievements in the cinema industry.

Golden Globe Awards
The Golden Globe Award is an accolade bestowed by the 93 members of the Hollywood Foreign Press Association (HFPA) recognizing excellence in film and television, both domestic and foreign.

Goya Awards
The Goya Awards are the national film awards of Spain presented by the Academy of Cinematographic Arts and Sciences of Spain.

European Film Awards
The European Film Awards are presented annually by the European Film Academy to recognize excellence in European cinematic achievements.

Independent Spirit Awards
The Independent Spirit Awards are awards dedicated to independent filmmakers.

News & Documentary Emmy Awards
The News & Documentary Emmy Awards are presented by the National Academy of Television Arts and Sciences (NATAS) in recognition of excellence in American national news and documentary programming.

Platino Awards
The Platino Awards are presented annually to recognize Ibero-American film.

Venice Film Festival
The Venice Film Festival, is an annual film festival held in Venice, Italy.

Other awards

Critics associations

References

External links
 

Lists of awards received by film director